The Paznaun is a valley in Tyrol, Austria, leading south-west from Pians (856 m) to the Bielerhöhe (2071 m), a mountain pass at the border of Vorarlberg and Tyrol.

The Paznaun is watered by the Trisanna and surrounded by the Central Eastern Alps, specifically, the mountain ranges of Verwall in the north, Samnaun in the south-east and Silvretta in the south-west. The main villages in the Paznaun are See (1050m), Kappl (1226m), Ischgl (1377m) and Galtür (1586m). Today, the main economic activity in the valley is tourism, especially winter sports. Each of the main villages has its own ski resort with the resort of Ischgl being the most prominent one.

Valleys of Tyrol (state)
Valleys of the Alps
Verwall Alps
Silvretta Alps